Jorge Bornhausen (Rio de Janeiro, October 1, 1937) is a Brazilian politician. He was governor of the state of Santa Catarina from 1979 to 1982, and senator for Santa Catarina from 1983 to 1991 and from 1999 to 2007. He was also President of the Democrats party (DEM, formerly known as 'Liberal Front Party').

Bornhausen received a law degree at the Pontifical Catholic University of Rio de Janeiro in 1960. After college, he went to work at the Bank of Industry and Commerce (Inco), where his father was the majority shareholder.

In 1967, Bornhausen entered politics when was appointed Lieutenant Governor by the National Renewal Alliance (ARENA). He was president of ARENA from 1972 to 1975, president of Banco do Estado de Santa Catarina until 1978, and then was appointed to the Santa Catarina Legislative Assembly where he served until 1982.

At the end of his legislative term. Bornhausen was elected senator for the Social Democratic Party, the successor to ARENA. The following year he participated in the founding of the Liberal Front Party (FPL), and was elected president.

In the private sector, Bornhausen is a member of the Advisory Council of Industries Chapecó and Mercedes-Benz in Brazil.

References

1937 births
Living people
Governors of Santa Catarina (state)
Brazilian people of German descent
Members of the Federal Senate (Brazil)
Democrats (Brazil) politicians